Assara exiguella is a species of snout moth in the genus Assara. It was described by Aristide Caradja in 1926 and is known from China and Japan.

The larvae feed on chestnut. They bore the fruit of their host plant. The species overwinters in fallen chestnut shells and trunks.

References

Moths described in 1926
Phycitini
Moths of Asia
Moths of Japan
Taxa named by Aristide Caradja